Noi Testarde was a feminist magazine published in Italy. Its title means We stubborn women in English indicating the radical feminist approach of the magazine. Although the magazine did not enjoy higher levels of circulation, it was one of the publications which helped autonomist feminism in Italy and abroad to build a legacy.

References

Defunct magazines published in Italy
Feminist magazines
Italian-language magazines
Magazines with year of disestablishment missing
Magazines with year of establishment missing
Women's magazines published in Italy